Zhou Shengxian (born December 1949) is a retired Chinese politician who served as the inaugural Minister of Environmental Protection.

Biography
Zhou was born in Wuzhong, Ningxia Hui Autonomous Region. He joined the Chinese Communist Party in 1972, and is a senior economist.  He began his career as a middle school teacher. Eventually he rose to become Secretary-General of the Ningxia Autonomous Regional government, then Vice-Chairman of Ningxia, then he became deputy director of the State Forestry Administration.

He became Minister of Environmental Protection in 2008, after the ministry was reformed from the Environment Protection Bureau. The ministry was given more powers than the Bureau. He left office as environmental protection minister in 2015 due to having reached the mandatory retirement age of 65 for minister-level officials. Since then he has become a member of the Chinese People's Political Consultative Conference, and sits on the Committee of Population, Resources and Environment.

Zhou was an alternate member of the 16th Central Committee of the Chinese Communist Party, and a full member of the 17th and 18th Central Committees.

References

People's Republic of China politicians from Ningxia
1949 births
Living people
Chinese Communist Party politicians from Ningxia
People from Wuzhong
Ministers of Environmental Protection of the People's Republic of China